This is for the mythical allies of Aeneas. For the story written about them by Virgil, see Aeneid
In Roman mythology, the Aeneads were the friends, family and companions of Aeneas, with whom they fled from Troy after the Trojan War. Aenides was another patronymic from Aeneas, which is applied by Gaius Valerius Flaccus to the inhabitants of Cyzicus, whose town was believed to have been founded by Cyzicus, the son of Aeneas and Aenete. Similarly, Aeneades was a patronymic from Aeneas, and applied as a surname to those who were believed to have been descended from him, such as Ascanius, Augustus, and the Romans in general.

The Aeneads included:
Achates
Acmon, son of Clytius (son of Aeolus),
Anchises
Creusa, wife of Aeneas and mother of Ascanius
Ascanius
Iapyx
the Lares
Nisus and Euryalus, heroes of the helmet episode in Book 9
Mimas
Misenus, Aeneas' trumpeter
Mnestheus, possibly Aeneas' most senior commander
the Penates
Serestus
Sergestus
Achaemenides, one of Odysseus' crew the Aeneads picked up in Sicily (strictly speaking not an Aenead as he was not Trojan, but Greek).

See also
The Golden Bough (mythology)
Aeneid

Notes

References 

 Gaius Valerius Flaccus, Argonautica translated by Mozley, J H. Loeb Classical Library Volume 286. Cambridge, MA, Harvard University Press; London, William Heinemann Ltd. 1928. Online version at theio.com.
 Gaius Valerius Flaccus, Argonauticon. Otto Kramer. Leipzig. Teubner. 1913. Latin text available at the Perseus Digital Library.
 Publius Ovidius Naso, Letters From Pontus translated by A. S. Kline, © Copyright 2003. Online version at the Topos Text Project.
 Publius Ovidius Naso, Ex Ponto. Arthur Leslie Wheeler. Cambridge, MA. Harvard University Press. 1939. Latin text available at the Perseus Digital Library.
 Publius Ovidius Naso, Metamorphoses translated by Brookes More (1859-1942). Boston, Cornhill Publishing Co. 1922. Online version at the Perseus Digital Library.
 Publius Ovidius Naso, Metamorphoses. Hugo Magnus. Gotha (Germany). Friedr. Andr. Perthes. 1892. Latin text available at the Perseus Digital Library.
 Publius Vergilius Maro, Aeneid. Theodore C. Williams. trans. Boston. Houghton Mifflin Co. 1910. Online version at the Perseus Digital Library.
 Publius Vergilius Maro, Bucolics, Aeneid, and Georgics. J. B. Greenough. Boston. Ginn & Co. 1900. Latin text available at the Perseus Digital Library.

Characters in Roman mythology
Trojans
Characters in the Aeneid
Patronymics from Greek mythology
Ancient Greek families